Lamsdorf or Lambsdorff is a surname. Notable people with the surname include:

 Alexander Graf Lambsdorff (born 1966), German politician
 Vladimir Lamsdorf (1845–1907), Russian statesman of Baltic German descent
 Otto Graf Lambsdorff (1926–2009), German politician

German-language surnames